Irving A. Greenfield (1929-2020) was a humanities professor and the prolific author of over 300 novels. He is best known as the writer of Ancient of Days and Only the Dead Speak Russian.

Biography 
Dr. Irving Greenfield was born in Brooklyn, New York on February 22, 1929. Graduating from Brooklyn College in 1950, Greenfield spent two years in the Merchant Marine and served during the Korean War in the combat infantry. He was later awarded a PhD for his work in fiction.

For 18 years, Greenfield taught as an Associate Professor (Adjunct) at Wagner College in the Humanities Department. He is still associated with the college, holding the title of Research Fellow, with an expertise in English Literature and in Composition. Greenfield now teaches at the Discovery Institute at the College of Staten Island.

Creative work 
Dr. Irving Greenfield's work has appeared in a variety of media. Greenfield's short stories have appeared in several publications, including Amsterdam Quarterly, The Vignette Review, A Thousand and One Stories, Maudlin House, Hippocampus Magazine, Electron Magazine, Chicago Literati, The Stone Canoe (electronic edition), The Stone Hobo, Contraposition, The Furious Gazelle, Festival Writer, Shadowgraph, Way Too Fantasy, Prime Mincer, Lavender Wolves Literary Journal, eFiction Mag, Foliate Oak Literary Magazine, The Note, Sleet Magazine, Barking Sycamores, Writing for Tomorrow, The Raven's Perch, Brawler, Runaway Parade, and Amarillo Bay.

Universal International adapted his novel Tagget into a 1991 film for TV starring Daniel J. Travanti. Greenfield has additionally published one-act and full-length plays, to much critical acclaim. His one-act play, "Billy," was one of five nominated winners of the Yukon Pacific Play Award, and also won a Nova Award for the most original play on CTV. Greenfield'a video play, "Camp #2, Bucharest," won a Nova Award for the best drama of 1998 on Community Access TV. Finally, his novel, Ancient of Days, was on the New York Post'''s bestseller list for six weeks, though his masterpiece is typically considered to be his novel, Only the Dead Speak Russian''.

References 

American male writers
1929 births
2020 deaths
Brooklyn College alumni